Bowen Wildlife Management Area is a Wildlife Management Area in Prince George's County, Maryland. It was deeded by Harry L. Bowen to the state of Maryland in 1955 for $1.00. The area is 80 percent water-covered and is a popular site for waterfowl hunting and canoeing.

References

External links
 Bowen Wildlife Management Area

Wildlife management areas of Maryland
Protected areas of Prince George's County, Maryland
IUCN Category V
Protected areas established in 1955
1955 establishments in Maryland